Christian Larsen is a former New Zealand rower.

At the 1962 British Empire and Commonwealth Games he won the silver medal as part of the men's eight alongside crew members Leslie Arthur, Darien Boswell, Colin Cordes, Alistair Dryden, Alan Grey, Louis Lobel, Robert Page and Alan Webster.

References

Year of birth missing (living people)
Living people
New Zealand male rowers
Rowers at the 1962 British Empire and Commonwealth Games
Commonwealth Games silver medallists for New Zealand
Commonwealth Games medallists in rowing
Medallists at the 1962 British Empire and Commonwealth Games